Mount Fries (pronounced “frees” or "freeze") is a prominent peak,  high, standing just south of the mouth of Zeller Glacier and being one of the westernmost summits along the south wall of Byrd Glacier. The peak is part of the Transantarctic Mountain chain which separates East Antarctica from West Antarctica. The mountain was named in 1965 by the Advisory Committee on Antarctic Names for Robert H. Fries, who was the aurora and airglow research scientist at South Pole Station during Operation Deepfreeze 1963. Fries was the first astronomer to winter-over at the South Pole. His summary report for the year stated that the South Pole location would be ideal for a variety of astronomical studies. In later years, this came to fruition, with significant astrophysical research ongoing at Pole Station. Project IceCube detects and measures cosmic neutrinos, while the millimeter/submillimeter South Pole Telescope studies the cosmic microwave background arising from the earliest moments of the Universe.

References

Mountains of Oates Land